Oeonia is a genus of rare orchids (family (Orchidaceae) comprising 5 currently accepted species native to Madagascar and the Mascarenes.

References

External links 

Angraecinae
Orchids of Madagascar
Vandeae genera